Speed Madness is a 1932 American action film directed by George Crone and starring Richard Talmadge, Nancy Drexel and Huntley Gordon.

Plot
Bob Stuart, the idle son of a shipbuilding magnate gets a job at his father's shipyard. The company's major project is to design a new speedboat in order to win a major new contract but faces sabotage from rivals. Bob turns out to be surprisingly able and manages to help with the construction of the boat. He plans to drive it himself during the race, but narrowly escapes a bomb planted on it by their opponents. He confronts the gang behind it and secure his father the contract.

Cast
 Richard Talmadge as 	Bob Stuart
 Charles Sellon as 	Jim Stuart
 Lucien Littlefield as Forbes
 Nancy Drexel as Joan Harlan
 Huntley Gordon as Harrington 
 Donald Keith as Alan Harlan
 Pat O'Malley as McCarey
 Matthew Betz as 	Jessin 
 Wade Boteler as 	Bill Collector
 Walter Brennan as Joe

References

Bibliography
 Langman, Larry & Finn, Daniel. A Guide to American Crime Films of the Thirties. Greenwood Press, 1995.
 Rollyson, Carl. A Real American Character: The Life of Walter Brennan. University Press of Mississippi, 2015.

External links
 

1932 films
1930s action films
Boat racing films
American action films
Films directed by George Crone
American black-and-white films
1930s English-language films
1930s American films